"Colours" is a song written and recorded by British singer-songwriter Donovan. The "Colours" single was released in the United Kingdom on 28 May 1965 through Pye Records (Pye 7N 15866) and a few months later in the United States through Hickory Records (Hickory 45-1324).  The "Colours" single was backed with "To Sing for You" (previously included on What's Bin Did and What's Bin Hid) on the United Kingdom release and "Josie" (from What's Bin Did and What's Bin Hid) on the United States release.

Release and reception

Donovan followed up the success of "Catch the Wind" with "Colours", which featured a similar folk style.  The single matched the success of "Catch the Wind" in the United Kingdom, reaching No. 4 on the charts.  In the United States, "Colours" reached No.61, and marked a decline in the artist's popularity relative to "Catch the Wind".  A different mix of the song (without harmonica) was released on his second album Fairytale.  Billboard praised the "intriguing lyric and melody."  Cash Box described it as a "tender, slow-moving, rhythmic pledge of romantic devotion sold by the songster in his distinctive Bob Dylan-ish style."

When Epic Records was compiling Donovan's Greatest Hits, they were either unable or unwilling to secure the rights to the original recordings of "Catch the Wind" and "Colours".  Donovan re-recorded both songs in the studio with Big Jim Sullivan playing guitar, John Paul Jones on bass and keyboards and Clem Cattini on drums, produced by Mickie Most. The re-recordings were included on the greatest hits album.

Other versions by Donovan

A live duet with Joan Baez from the 1965 Newport Folk Festival is included on the 1995 compilation Folk Music at Newport, Part 1.
The 2002 film The Rules of Attraction features a re-recorded version by Donovan which would after be used in various television commercials.

Covers by others

 Joan Baez included a solo version of "Colours" on her 1965 album Farewell, Angelina.
 In 1967, Van Dyke Parks created a (loose) instrumental adaptation of this song titled "Donovan's Colours", which was released as a single (credited to George Washington Brown) and as a track on Parks' first album Song Cycle, respectively. This version features mostly the original chord progression, albeit in completely different ragtime arrangement.
Donovan collaborated with the Spanish group Mocedades for a cover of the song with Spanish/English lyrics included in the latter's 1986 album Colores.
Terence Stamp covered the song in the 1967 film Poor Cow. Footage of Stamp singing the song in this film would later appear as a closing flashback in the 1999 film The Limey which also starred Stamp.
 A cover of the song, released in 1990, was the first single of British art rock duo No-Man and the first release under their current name (their first releases from 1989 had their previous moniker "No Man Is An Island"). The later re-release of the song had an original song, "Drink Judas", as a b-side. Both songs were later included in the duo's 1992 third EP: Lovesighs – An Entertainment, with "Drink Judas" being re-recorded and "Colours" remixed.
Finbar Furey included a version of "Colours" on his 2012 album of the same name.
 "Žlutá" by Zdena Lorencová was released in Czechoslovakia in 1972. This interpretation has lyrics in Czech, which are mainly about yellow.

References

External links
 Colours (Single) – Donovan Unofficial Site

Donovan songs
Pye Records singles
1965 singles
Songs written by Donovan
Joan Baez songs
1990 singles
1965 songs